Šutalo is a Croatian surname. Notable people with the surname include:

Boško Šutalo (born 2000), Croatian footballer
Ivana Šutalo (born 1994), Croatian judoka
Marko Šutalo (born 1983), Serbia-born Bosnian basketball player

Croatian surnames